Paraxenisthmus is a genus of goby from the western Pacific. They were classified as being in the family Xenisthmidae but this family is regarded as a synonym of the Eleotridae.

Species
Two specvies are classified as members of the Paraxenisthmus

 Paraxenisthmus cerberusi  Winterbottom & Gill, 2006
 Paraxenisthmus springeri Gill & Hoese 1993

References

Eleotridae